Anisodontea is a genus of flowering plants in the tribe Malveae of the mallow family Malvaceae. It comprises twenty-one species native to South Africa. Members of the genus typically bear toothed leaves with three or five palmate, uneven lobes. Members of the genus also typically bear flowers with a pubescent calyx, a five-petaled corolla streaked from the center and pink to magenta in color, and stamens with anthers of a dark color.

Cultivation  
Members of the genus are classed as half-hardy. They thrive in cool-temperate climates and are used as summer bedding and in mild coastal areas where they may be grown as border plants. For several species, the seeds should be sown in spring. Half-harden cuttings should be taken in summer but need bottom heat. They do best in loam-based gritty compost and positioned in full sun.

Anisodontea capensis, the African mallow, is a recipient of the Royal Horticultural Society's Award of Garden Merit.

Species
Anisodontea alexandrii
Anisodontea anomala
Anisodontea biflora
Anisodontea bryoniifolia
Anisodontea capensis
Anisodontea dissecta
Anisodontea dregeana
Anisodontea elegans
Anisodontea fruticosa
Anisodontea gracilis
Anisodontea hypomandarum
Anisodontea julii
Anisodontea malvastroides
Anisodontea procumbens
Anisodontea pseudocapensis
Anisodontea racemosa
Anisodontea reflexa
Anisodontea scabrosa
Anisodontea setosa
Anisodontea theronii
Anisodontea triloba

References

Lord, Tony; Flora : The Gardener's Bible, Cassell (London), 2003
http://www.homolaicus.com/scienza/erbario/utility/botanica_sistematica/hypertext/0110.htm#000000 Botanica Sistematica

External links
 PlantZAfrica.com: profile of Anisodontea julii

Malveae
Flora of South Africa
Malvaceae genera